Grand Prince was the title used by contemporary sources to name the leader of the federation of the Hungarian tribes in the tenth century.

The grand prince was probably elected by the leaders of the federation of the seven Hungarian tribes and the three Kabar tribes (dissident Khazar tribes) that joined the Hungarians before 830. However, the first grand prince, Álmos, father of Árpád, was more likely appointed by the khagan of the Khazars. It is still under discussion  whether the grand prince was the spiritual leader of the federation, the military commander of the Hungarian tribes or the title was a new creation.

By the time of Géza, Transylvania had been ruled by a (semi-)independent leader.

The title disappeared on the coronation of Stephen I on 25 December 1000 or 1 January 1001.

Grand princes of the Hungarians
 Álmos (c. 850 – c. 895)
 Árpád (c. 895 – c. 907)
 Zolta (c. 907 – c. 950)
 Fajsz (c. 950 – c. 955)
 Taksony (c. 955 – c. 970)
 Géza (c. 970 – 997)
 Stephen / Vajk (997 – 1000, became the first king of the Hungarians)
It is not known exactly how many grand princes of Hungary ruled between the supposed date of Árpád‘s death (c. 907) and when Fajsz ascended to the throne (c. 948), because it seems that the chroniclers of the Hungarian kings, who came from the branch of Solt after 1000, wanted to make the people of the kingdom, to forget the rule between 907 and 950, of the other branches of the Árpád dynasty, coming from the other 3 sons of Árpád: Tarkacsu/Liüntika, Jelek, Jutocsa, who, or their offspring probably ruled Hungary during this period, according to the nomadic custom of agnatic seniority, used by the Hungarian rulers before 1000. The quietness of the chronicles is the reason why today's historians cannot establish precisely the whole list of the Hungarian grand princes between 907 and 955, and the only known rulers are Solt (from the Hungarian chronicles) and Fajsz from the book of the Byzantine emperor Constantine VII, De Administrando Imperio, which preserved a longer list of names from the Árpád-family, than the Hungarian chronicles, preoccupied only with the ruling branch of Solt. The reason of forgetting Fajsz from the Hungarian chronicles was the fact that he was not son of Solt, but of Jutocsa. Without the existence of De Administrando Imperio, very little would be known about him. The De Administrando Imperio preserved the name of Fajsz as the Grand Prince of the Hungarians, because it was written during his reign. But the names of the other grand princes, who were not from the branch of Solt, who probably ruled before and after him, are unknown.

See also
 Principality of Hungary
 List of Hungarian rulers
 King of Hungary

References

Sources
 Korai Magyar Történeti Lexikon (9-14. század), főszerkesztő: Kristó, Gyula, szerkesztők: Engel, Pál és Makk, Ferenc (Akadémiai Kiadó, Budapest, 1994)
 Kristó, Gyula: A Kárpát-medence és a magyarság régmúltja (1301-ig) (Szegedi Középkortörténeti Könyvtár, Szeged, 1993)

Hungarian royalty
 
820s establishments
9th-century establishments in Hungary
1000 disestablishments in Europe